Ryszard Jan Wawryniewicz (born 18 January 1962) is a Polish politician.

Wawryniewicz was born in Wałbrzych.  He was elected to the Sejm on 25 September 2005, getting 7663 votes in 2 Wałbrzych district as a candidate from the Law and Justice list.

He was also a member of Sejm 1997-2001.

See also
Members of Polish Sejm 2005-2007

External links
Ryszard Wawryniewicz - parliamentary page - includes declarations of interest, voting record, and transcripts of speeches.

1962 births
Living people
People from Wałbrzych
Members of the Polish Sejm 2005–2007
Members of the Polish Sejm 1997–2001
Law and Justice politicians